William So Wing Hong (born 24 September 1967) is a Hong Kong actor and a Cantopop singer. He began his musical career by participating the New Talent Singing Awards in 1985 and won the competition as the first runner up to Alex To. His performance at that event earned him a record contract with Capital Artists, with which he released an EP. 1998 was the peak year for William So with his hit song Kiss More, Sad More, which is also the theme song for the popular TV Series Healing Hands.

Discography

Filmography

TV series

Web Drama

Awards

References

External links 
 

1967 births
Living people
Big Four (band) members
Cantopop singers
Hong Kong Buddhists
Hong Kong male film actors
Hong Kong male singers
Hong Kong male television actors
New Talent Singing Awards contestants
20th-century Hong Kong male actors
21st-century Hong Kong male actors